OpenDroneMap is an open source photogrammetry toolkit to process aerial imagery (usually from a drone) into maps and 3D models. The software is hosted and distributed freely on GitHub.

OpenDroneMap has been integrated within American Red Cross's in-field Portable OpenStreetMap system.

References 

Photogrammetry software
Free and open-source software
Cross-platform free software